16 distinct public holidays are observed in Myanmar.

Public holidays

References

External links
 2016 Public Holidays in Myanmar

Myanmar
Burmese culture
Observances set by the Burmese calendar
Holidays
Public holidays in Myanmar